Trifurcula puplesisi is a moth of the family Nepticulidae. It is known from the Caspian Sea area in Europe and southern Turkmenistan

The wingspan is 6.2–8 mm for males and about 7.3 mm for females. Adults were found in a steppe, almost desert, area in May, June and July.

External links
Nepticulidae and Opostegidae of the world

Nepticulidae
Moths of Europe
Moths of Asia
Moths described in 1990